HVK may refer to:

 Haveke language, spoken in New Caledonia
 Hidden Valley Kings, an American street gang
 Hólmavík Airport, in Iceland
 HVK Gusar, a Croatian rowing club
 Patriotic Electoral Coalition, a former political coalition in Hungary
 Herbert von Karajan, an Austrian orchestral conductor
 Hans von Kaltenborn, American radio commentator